Lucina Hagman (5 June 1853, Kälviä – 6 September 1946) was an early Finnish feminist and among the first female MPs in the world due to the 1907 Finnish parliamentary election.

Life and career
Hagman was the daughter of police master Nils Johan Erik Hagman and Margareta Sofia Nordman, a police chief in rural Kälviä. She was the sister of the educator Sofia Hagman and writer Tycho Hagman. She became a teacher and Jean Sibelius might be the most famous individuals to study at her school. She became active in women's causes serving in Parliament from 1907 to 1917. Of the 200 MPs elected in 1907 just 19 were women. The successful women included Hagman, Miina Sillanpää, Anni Huotari, Hilja Pärssinen, Hedvig Gebhard, Ida Aalle, Mimmi Kanervo, Eveliina Ala-Kulju, Hilda Käkikoski, Liisi Kivioja, Sandra Lehtinen, Dagmar Neovius, Maria Raunio, Alexandra Gripenberg, Iida Vemmelpuu, Maria Laine, Jenny Nuotio and Hilma Räsänen.

Lucina Hagman also founded the Martha organisation, served as the first chair of Unioni, The League of Finnish Feminists, and was active in the peace movement. She also wrote a biography of Fredrika Bremer.

See also
 List of peace activists

References 

1853 births
1946 deaths
People from Kokkola
People from Vaasa Province (Grand Duchy of Finland)
Young Finnish Party politicians
Members of the Parliament of Finland (1907–08)
Members of the Parliament of Finland (1916–17)
Finnish feminists
Finnish suffragists
20th-century Finnish women writers
Finnish women's rights activists
Finnish pacifists
Pacifist feminists